Shatru/Birodh is a 1986 Hindi/Bengali-language film starring Rajesh Khanna in the lead in a role playing the role of an inspector in a remote village. The film was an Indo-Bangladeshi venture and the music was written by R.D. Burman. The film was a frame-by-frame remake of Shatru, which starred Ranjit Mallick.

Plot
There is a village named Haridaspur, where Ashok Sharma has been posted as an Inspector in charge. When he arrives in the remote village, he comes to the rescue of a blind man and a widow, and has a fist fight with Nishikant Shah and his men. The immediate next day, Shah finds out that the person with whom his men fought with was Ashok himself. Then to make friendship with Ashok, he goes to pay homage, but Ashok refuses. After a string of incidences, Ashok learns of the misdeeds carried out by Nishikant Shah and MLA Gopal Choudary. Ashok then realises he has to help the people of the village from being exploited by these rich men. Meanwhile, he starts to live in the village as a paying guest at the house of a girl Asha and also gets fond of an orphan child from the village named Chotu. Ashok then learns that Chotu's father was a loyal farmer who was duped and was killed by Nishikant's men. He even promises Chotu of bringing the culprits to book. Somehow then Shah and his friend Choudhry manage to put Ashok in trouble by fixing a blame on him of killing a man in his custody. Due to this, he then faces a situation where he could lose his job and his good reputation too.

Cast
Rajesh Khanna as Inspector Ashok Sharma
Shabana Sidique as Asha
Prem Chopra as Nishikant Shah
Arun Govil as Sub-Inspector Salim
Master Tapu as Chotu
Ashok Kumar as Superintendent of Police
Om Shivpuri as Gopal Choudhry, MLA
Raj Kiran as Raj Choudhry
Mac Mohan as Kanu
Anup Kumar as Anup Chatterjee
Komal Mahuvakar as the professor's granddaughter
Hasan Imam as Professor
Golam Mostafa  as Corrupt Police officer
Nuton as Dancer

Music
Lyrics: Anand Bakshi
"Tere Aanchal Mein" - Lata Mangeshkar
"Babuji Dil Loge" - Asha Bhosle
"Main Teraa Bismil Hoon" - Andrew Kishore
"Iski Topi Uske Sar" - Kishore Kumar
"Sooraj Chandaa Saagar Parbat" - Andrew Kishore & Chorus

References

External links
 

1986 films
Hindi remakes of Bengali films
1980s Hindi-language films
Films scored by R. D. Burman
Films directed by Pramod Chakravorty